Alexei Viktorovich Ivanov (born November 23, 1969) is a Russian award-winning writer.

Biography

Early Years and First Works 

Ivanov was born in Nizhny Novgorod into a family of shipbuilding engineers. In 1971 the family moved to Perm, where he grew up. In 1987, he entered Ural State University as a journalism student. He left college after a year, returning in 1990 to study art and culturology. An assignment from a workplace was required to enroll, later Ivanov confessed that he forged a paper, proving that he worked in a museum. Ivanov graduated in 1996.

His first publication was a fantastic story called "Hunt for the Great Bear," published in 1990 in the magazine Uralsky sledopyt with 500,000 circulation. After returning to Perm, Ivanov worked as a guard, schoolteacher, university teacher, and tourist guide; the latter occupation brought him to study local history, which he later explored in his writing. However, for thirteen years all literary works of Ivanov were ‘hidden in the table’.

Career 

He first became known for his 2003 novel  (The Heart of Parma). The novel about Great Perm of mid-14th century included real historical figures such as knyaz  and his son , their enemy mansi knyaz , moscovite , as long as pagan magic, war mooses, witches, and adventures. The story unfolded in the times when Christian Moscow forcibly united distant, often pagan's lands and forged them into a united state. Russian writer Leonid Yuzefovich helped Ivanov to get his first contracts with Vagrius and Palmira publishing houses and publish the book. Influence and popularity of the novel grew so big that some peers state that Ivanov no less that ‘reinvented Perm’.

A great admirer of Ivanov's prose, Russian critic Lev Danilkin says it takes a lot of courage to enter the Russian literature world with such a common surname, like Ivanov's. In 2009 Ivanov started working with literature producer Yuliya Zaytseva. They founded the producing centre ‘July’ and hired accounting, legal, and technical teams. As explained by Zaytseva, the centre allowed Ivanov to create more complicated art and social projects. Since 2010 for all his books they organised expeditions to distant villages in the Perm region to work on ethnography of the stories.

In 2009 Ivanov co-authored with Pavel Lungin the screenplay to the ‘Tzar’ movie.

The screenplay ‘Tobol’, written by Ivanov, was significantly altered by the movie's director and as a result the writer refused to be named one of the co-authors. The picture's titles only had the line ‘based on Alexey Ivanov's novel’.

In 2021 in Kaliningrad Ivanov presented his new book ‘Shadows of Teutons’.

Social Activities and Art Projects 
While working on the novel ‘Serdtse Parmy’, Ivanov established a local museum of regional studies for children. The items for its collection were picked during the expeditions that Ivanov organized for his students. Some of the experience as a tutor for ‘troubled’ teenagers was later reflected in Ivanov's award-winning novel ‘The Geographer Drank His Globe Away’. However, after several years of successful work the museum was closed by the local authorities, nowadays there is a billiard center in its former building.

Ivanov also worked on various projects aiming to create a better image of Perm, add fresh air into its cultural life, pay tribute to its long and colorful history. In 2009 with journalist Leonid Parfenov Ivanov made a movie ‘Backboneof Russia: Perm’.

In the early 2010s Ivanov initiated a series of editions ‘Perm as Text’ that included works of many writers from the East Europe. However, the local Perm authorities, as described by Ivanov himself, gave him money for the series with one hand and stole budgets with the other. The project eventually died. In 2013 he publicly named Perm authorities ‘rogues and slobes’.

In 2014 Ivanov co-authored an art album ‘Ekaterinburg: Multiply by Million’ with artist Valery Shtukaturov. One thousand copies were printed, mostly sponsored by private donors, and were distributed as gifts. Ivanov waved his fee.

Ivanov openly opposed Marat Gelman and his cultural project ‘PERMM’ in the region, because according to Ivanov they neglected and ignored Perm's unique identity and heritage and tried to make a ‘second Winzavod’ there. The writer found it offensive that the authorities granted Gelman's museum of contemporary art 90 mln roubles and in the meantime gave only 30 mln to the Perm Art Gallery. In culmination of the scandal, Ivanov even refused his  and moved to live in Ekaterinburg.

Ivanov had never been abroad before 2012, only then he went to Prague for the first time. As of 2019, the writer lives in emigration.

Bibliography

Novels

 1992 — Dormitory-on-Blood (‘Общага-на-Крови’);
 2003 —The Heart of Parma, or Cherdyn is the queen of mountains (Сердце Пармы, или Чердынь — княгиня гор ’);
 2003 — Geograf globus propil (‘Географ глобус пропил’), adapted into a movie The Geographer Drank His Globe Away;
 2005 — Zoloto bunta, ili Vniz po reke tesnin (‘Золото бунта, или Вниз по реке теснин’);
 2007 — Bluda i MUDO (‘Блуда и МУДО’);
 2009 — Letoischisleniye ot Ioanna (‘Летоисчисление от Иоанна’);
 2011 — Psoglavtsy (‘Псоглавцы’);
 2012 — Community (‘Комьюнити’);
 2017 — Tobol (‘Тобол’);
 2018 — Food block (‘Пищеблок’);
 2020 — To Be Alexey Ivanov (‘Быть Алексеем Ивановым’);
 2021 — Shadows of the Teutons (‘Тени тветонов’).

Screenplays
 Tsar, 2009, won 2009 Cannes Film Festival's Un Certain Regard award.
The Geographer Drank His Globe Away, 2013, won multiple awards including "Best film" of Russia's main cinematic Nika Award.

Awards 
Ivanov was awarded the Mamin-Sibiryak Prize in 2003; the Eureka, Start, and Bazhov prizes in 2004; and the Book of the Year and Portal prizes in 2006. He has been nominated three times for the National Bestseller prize.
 , 2006. The accolade is given for significant contribution to the Perm region, its development and culture. Ivanov refused the award in 2009 and donated all the money to the Perm Stroganoff museum.
 ‘Book of the Year’ for ‘Nenastye’, 2016.

References

Sources

External links
Ivanov's home page
OKNO literary agency author page

1969 births
Living people
Writers from Perm, Russia
Russian male novelists
Pavel Bazhov Prize recipients
Academic staff of Ural State University